Meri may refer to:

Meri (name)
Meri (mythology), folk hero in Bororo mythology
Meri, term in shakuhachi music
The Meri, novel by Maya Kaathryn Bohnhoff
Meri, release title of La Mer (film) in Finland
Meri (political party), now-defunct political party in Israel
Meri or Mery, an ancient Egyptian name

Places
Merì, town in Italy
Meri, Cameroon, commune in Extrême-Nord region
Meri, Iran (disambiguation)
Meri, a village in Drăgăneşti Commune, Prahova County, Romania
Meri, a village in Vedea Commune, Teleorman County, Romania